Thando Roto (born 26 September 1995) is a South African sprinter.

References

1995 births
Living people
South African male sprinters
Place of birth missing (living people)
World Athletics Championships athletes for South Africa
Universiade medalists in athletics (track and field)
Universiade silver medalists for South Africa
Medalists at the 2017 Summer Universiade